The 1998 Sokcho submarine incident occurred on 22 June 1998, offshore of the South Korean city of Sokcho.

Capture 
A South Korean fishing boat observed several submarine crewmen trying to untangle the submarine from the fishing net. The South Korean Navy sent a Pohang-class corvette which towed the submarine (with the crew still inside) to a navy base at the port of Donghae. The submarine sank as it was being towed into port; it was unclear if this was as a result of damage or a deliberate scuttling by the crew. 

On 23 June, the Korean Central News Agency admitted that a submarine had been lost in a training accident. 

The presence of South Korean drinks suggested that the crew had completed an espionage mission. Log books found in the submarine showed that it had infiltrated South Korean waters on a number of previous occasions.

The bodies of the members of submarine crew were subsequently returned to North Korea in a ceremony that took place in Panmunjom on 3 July 1998.

See also
1996 Gangneung submarine infiltration incident
1998 Yeosu submersible incident

References

External links
 BBC News photo of the submarine

Sokcho
Maritime incidents in 1998
Korean People's Navy
Conflicts in 1998
1998 in South Korea
1998 in North Korea
Maritime incidents in South Korea
North Korea–South Korea relations
June 1998 events in Asia
Naval history of South Korea